Neymer José Miranda Martínez (born 9 January 1985) is a Colombian professional footballer, who plays as a midfielder.

References

External links 

1985 births
Living people
Colombian footballers
Real Cartagena footballers
Tigres F.C. footballers
Once Municipal footballers
Colombian expatriate footballers
Expatriate footballers in El Salvador
Association football midfielders